Didolodontidae is a possibly paraphyletic family of "condylarth" mammals known from the Paleogene of South America, with most specimens known from Argentina. They were generally small-medium in body size, and had a bunodont dentition. A close relationship with litopterns has been suggested by some studies. They range in age from the early Paleocene (Selandian/Peligran) to late Eocene (Priabonian/Mustersan). The attribution of Salladolodus deuterotheroides from the Late Oligocene of Bolivia to the family is doubtful.

References

Paleocene first appearances
Eocene extinctions
Prehistoric mammal families
Condylarths
Meridiungulata